Pseudopostega triangularis is a moth of the family Opostegidae. It known only from the type locality, in the north-central forests of Argentina.

The length of the forewings is about 2.6 mm. Adults are on wing in November.

Etymology
The species name is derived from the Latin triangulus (having three angles) in reference to the general triangular shape of the male gnathos.

External links
A Revision of the New World Plant-Mining Moths of the Family Opostegidae (Lepidoptera: Nepticuloidea)

Opostegidae
Moths described in 2007